Cape Verde competed in the 2003 All-Africa Games held at the National Stadium in the city of Abuja, Nigeria. The country sent one athlete, who returned with a gold medal in Taekwondo. This was the first gold medal for the country in the history of the Africa Games.

Competitors
Cape Verde sent a single athlete to compete in the games, 21-year old Fredson Gomes. He entered the men's welterweight in Taekwondo, which was held on 17 October.

Medal summary
Cape Verde won a gold medal. It was their first in the history of the games.

Medal table

List of Medalists

Gold Medal

References

2003 in Cape Verdean sport
Nations at the 2003 All-Africa Games
2003